Henry William Simpson aka Harry Simpson (born 2 June 1928 - died 20 February 2014) is a former  Australian rules footballer who played with South Melbourne in the Victorian Football League (VFL).

Simpson signed with Sandringham in the VFA in 1952 but was persuaded to transfer to Williamstown and played for the VFA Seagulls up until the end of 1955, when he went to Dimboola as captain-coach. He played 75 games and kicked 82 goals for Williamstown, which included the 1954 & 1955 premierships. Simpson won the Club best and fairest awards in 1953 and 1954 and was awarded the most serviceable player trophy in 1952. He was runner-up in the Liston Trophy (the VFA best and fairest award) in 1954 and was selected in the forward pocket in the Williamstown Team of the Century.

Notes

External links 

Living people
1928 births
Australian rules footballers from Victoria (Australia)
Sydney Swans players
Williamstown Football Club players